The Association of Islamic Organisations in Zurich (VIOZ) was founded in 1995 and is with more than 30 member organizations the largest cantonal Islamic umbrella organization in Switzerland. VIOZ member organizations operate over 40 mosques in the Canton of Zurich, which represents about 90% of all Zurich masjids.

VIOZ cooperates with the two national organizations, the Federation of Islamic Umbrella Organizations in Switzerland (FIDS) und Coordination of Islamic Organisations Switzerland (KIOS). Since March 2019 VIOZ is a member of FIDS.

VIOZ is the longtime partner of the city and the Canton of Zurich and is committed to the interests of the Muslims and their affiliates in the spirit of consensus.

In addition, VIOZ is constantly in contact with the state and other religious and social institutions becoming a co-designer of the Inter-religious dialogue in the canton of Zurich.

Mission 

In cooperation with the authorities, Muslim graves could be realized in the cities of Zurich and Winterthur. Moreover VIOZ offers volunteer training for mosque guides and could thus ensure that masjid tours are carried out by qualified persons. VIOZ organized for several years the "day of open mosques" in the Canton of Zurich and offers year-round mosque tours for those interested.

With the support of the Canton of Zurich, VIOZ was able to start a 2-year pilot project in 2014 for Muslim spiritual care services (MNFS). In this context, a 24-hour emergency number supported by Islamic specific ( CIG ) as well as emergency-pastoral (NNPN) trained Muslim Care Takers is available.

On July 1, 2016 the one-year pilot project for Muslim pastoral care within the Swiss Federal Asylum Centers started with VIOZ as a partner organization under the State Secretariat for Migration (SEM). During the pilot phase, the SEM is responsible for Muslim spiritual care. The applicants, who were recommended to the SEM by VIOZ, had to fulfil a list of criteria drawn up by the official Swiss Churches and the SEM. The catalog is based on the procedural provisions for the admission and withdrawal of prisons from the canton of Zurich. Both VIOZ as well as the individuals recommended were examined by the federal intelligence service and SEM internally.

The Government Council of the Canton of Zurich declared in December 2017 the commitment to collaborate with formally not yet recognized religious communities. Also, the Swiss Government included at the same time the Muslim spiritual care when releasing the national action plan (NAP) aimed at preventing radicalization and violent extremism. Furthermore, the NAP requests that Cantons provide adequate education possibilities for Muslim Care Takers. On February 22, 2018 the Canton of Zurich informed the public about the new Muslim spiritual care services for public hospitals and emergency services (MSNS). The MSNS has been established by the Canton Zurich, the officially recognized Zurich churches and VIOZ as an official partner. Therewith, the Zurich Department of Justice and Home Affairs mandated the MSNS for a 3-year pilot project. Before operational, Muslim Care Takers will be quality and security examined within a multilevel assessment process. Training and Education has been assigned to the Swiss Center of Islam and Society at the University Fribourg.

VIOZ also deals with community topics and has thus commissioned, within the scope of a student internship, to find out how environmentally conscious its members' organizations behave, the importance of environment-conscious behavior in Islam and how to draw Muslims's attention to the topic. As a result, an environmental brochure was developed, which is accessible online.

In addition the strategic goals  include the creation of grave fields for the Muslim population, a Central Zurich Mosque as well as an official recognition as a public community of faith by the Canton of Zurich. Further topics include youth work, preventing extremism and the general pastoral care in hospitals, prisons and asylum centers.

Affiliates (as of 12.2017) 

 Stiftung Islamische Gemeinschaft Zürich (SIGZ), Rötelstrasse 86, 8057 Zürich
 Dzemat der Islamischen Gemeinschaften Bosniens in Zürich, Grabenstrasse 7, 8952 Schlieren
 Verband der Islamischen Kulturzentren, Birmensdorferstrasse 273, 8055 Zürich
 Föderation der Islamischen Vereine in der Schweiz, Calandastrasse 11, 8048 Zürich
 Islamisches Zentrum Zürich, Müllackerstrasse 36, 8152 Glattbrugg
 Türkisch-Islamischer idealistischer Verein der Schweiz, Buckhauserstrasse 40, 8048 Zürich
 Türkisch-Islamische Stiftung für die Schweiz, Schwamendingenstrasse 102, 8050 Zürich
 Albanisch-Islamische Gemeinschaft, Rautistrasse 58, 8048 Zürich
 Swiss Muslim Society, Weinbergstrasse 147, 8006 Zürich
 Gemeinschaft der Kosovo Bosniaken, Industriestrasse 28, 8304 Wallisellen
 Verein für islamische Religionspädagogik Schweiz (VIRPS), Murzlenstr. 62, 8166 Niederweningen
 Verein für Islamische Kultur, Borrweg 60, 8055 Zürich
 Forum des Orients in der Schweiz, Hafnerstrasse 41, 8005 Zürich
 Mevlana Kultur Verein; Im Schörli 25, 8600 Dübendorf
 Türkisch-Islamischer Verein für die Schweiz Wädenswil Moschee, Florhofstrasse 7, 8820  Wädenswil
 Türkischer Verein, Theaterstrasse 25, 8400 Winterthur
 Albanisch-Islamischer Verein, Kronaustrasse 6, 8404 Winterthur
 Stiftung Islamisches Zentrum Volketswil, Juchstrasse 15, 8604 Volketswil
 Verein Percikan Iman, Verein südostasiatischer Muslime, 8000 Zürich
 Islamisch-Kultureller Verein Ahlebeyt, Grabenstrasse 7, 8952 Schlieren
 Kulturzentrum Sandzak, Hofstrasse 98, 8620 Wetzikon
 Islamische Gemeinschaft Kanton Zürich, Bahnstrasse 80, 8105 Regensdorf
 Islamische Gemeinschaft Volketswil Zürich IGVZ, Juchstrasse 15, 8604 Volketswil
 Blaue Moschee Merkez Zürich, Kochstrasse 22, 8004 Zürich
 Ummah, Muslimische Jugend Schweiz, 8000 Zürich
 Al Rahma Zentrum, Hohlstrasse 615a, 8048 Zürich
 Islamischer Kulturverein Embrach, Hardhofstrasse 15, 8424 Embrach
 Albanisch-Islamischer Kulturverein, Bahnhofstrasse 207, 8620 Wetzikon
 Kulturzentrum – Haus des Friedens, Saatlenstrasse 23, 8051 Zürich
 Islamischer Verein, Pumpwerkstrasse 26, 8105 Regensdorf
 Albanisch-Islamische Glaubensgemeinschaft Sunnah, Löwenstrasse 11, 8953 Dietikon
 Trägerverein Project Insert, Dörflistrasse 67, 8050 Zürich
 Somalisches Islamisches Kulturzentrum Schweiz, Eisgasse 6, 8004 Zürich
 Darut-lslah Verein, Loowiesenstrasse 28, 8106 Adtikon- Regensdorf
 Islamischer Albanischer Verein, Zürcherstrasse 300, 8406 Winterthur
Kulturverein Ikre, Zürichstrasse 38a, 8306 Brüttisellen

Intercultural and Religious Cooperation

Cantonal Cooperation (Zurich)  
 Interreligious Round Table in Canton Zurich
 Zurich forum of religions
 Zurich Institute for Interreligious Dialogue (ZIID)
 Paulus Academy Zurich
 Cantonal Institute for integration
 Integration Department of the city of Zurich
 Integration Department of the city of Winterthur
 Zurich cantonal police 'Brückenbauer'
 Chaplaincy for prisons and hospitals
 Muslim emergency pastoral Zurich
 Funeral and cemetery department of the city of Zurich

National Cooperation 
 Swiss Confederation - State Secretariat for Migration (SEM)
 Inter-religious Working Group in Switzerland (IRAS)
 Society for Minorities in Switzerland (GMS)
 National Coalition Building Institute (NCBI)
 palliative ostschweiz

References

External links 
 Website der Vereinigung der Islamischen Organisationen in Zürich

Islam in Switzerland
Swiss Muslims
Mosques in Switzerland
Muslim communities in Europe